15/Love is a Canadian television series that revolved around the lives of aspiring young tennis players at the Cascadia Tennis Academy. The show was created by Karen Troubetzkoy and Derek Schreyer. 15/Love premiered on the television channel YTV on September 6, 2004, concluding on October 16, 2006, having aired 54 episodes over 3 seasons. The series was filmed in Saint-Césaire, Quebec.

Series overview
The show focuses on the lives of hopeful teenage tennis players as they train at the internationally renowned Cascadia Tennis Academy. In this high-pressure environment, the characters struggle through adolescence and romance while trying to become the world champion tennis stars that they and others think they can be.

Cast

Main
 Laurence Leboeuf as Cody Myers
 Meaghan Rath as Adena Stiles
 Max Walker as Gary "Squib" Furlong
 Vadim Schneider as Sébastien Dubé (season 1)
 Phillip Lemaire provides the voice of Sebastien Dube
 Jaclyn Linetsky as Megan O'Connor (season 1)
 Sarah-Jeanne Labrosse as Sunny Capaduca
 Kyle Switzer as Rick Geddes
 Charles Powell as President Harold Bates
 Thierry Ashanti as Coach Artie Gunnerson (season 1)
 Amanda Crew as Tanis McTaggart (seasons 1–2; guest, season 3)
 Nwamiko Madden as Cameron White (seasons 1-2)
 Christian Schrapff as Jesse Siegel (season 3)
 Jemima West as Cassidy Payne (season 3)

Schneider and Linetsky were killed in a car accident on September 8, 2003, on their way to the set of 15/Love in St. Cesaire, Québec. Their deaths were written into the series as their characters were killed in a plane crash on their way home from a tennis tournament in the thirteenth episode.

Recurring
 Scott Thrun as Coach Skinner (season 2)
 Tyler Hynes as Nate Bates (seasons 2–3)
 Anthony Lemke as Coach Daniel Brock (season 3)

Cast timeline

Episodes

Season 1 (2004–05)

Season 2 (2005–06)

Season 3 (2006)

Broadcast
The series was broadcast on YTV in Canada. In the United States, the show is now streaming on Tubi and The Roku Channel.

Adaptations
A 3-part comic based on the television series, written by Andi Watson and drawn by Tommy Ohtsuka, was published by Marvel Comics.
15 Love 1 of 3 (UPC 5960605470-00111, 2011-06-08)
15 Love 2 of 3 (UPC 5960605470-00211, 2011-07-06)
15 Love 3 of 3 (UPC 5960605470-00311, 2011-08-03)
15 Love (ISBN 978-0-7851-1334-8, UPC 5960611334-00111, 2011-10-19): Includes 15 Love #1-3.

References

External links
Official 15/Love website

2000s Canadian comedy-drama television series
2000s Canadian teen drama television series
2000s Canadian teen sitcoms
2004 Canadian television series debuts
2006 Canadian television series endings
YTV (Canadian TV channel) original programming
Articles which contain graphical timelines
Television series by Corus Entertainment
Tennis on television
Television series about teenagers
Television shows set in Montreal